Teófilo E. Yldefonso (born Teófilo Yldefonso y de la Cruz; November 5, 1903 – June 19, 1942) was a Filipino breaststroke swimmer. He was the first Filipino and Southeast Asian to win an Olympic medal, and the first Filipino to win multiple medals.

Early life 
Teofilo Yldefonso was born on November 5, 1903 in Sitio Bayog, Piddig, Ilocos Norte to Felipe and Aniceta Yldefonso. He was the second among three siblings. His mother died after giving birth to his younger brother, who died at a young age. The Yldefonso siblings taught themselves to swim at the Guisit River.

Yldefonso joined 57th Infantry Regiment of the Philippine Scouts of the United States Army in 1922 upon turning 18 years old. It was with the military he was exposed to competitive swimming.

Career
Yldefonso began joining regional swimming meets in the 1923. Competing in the 200-meter breaststroke, he won multiple gold medals in the Far Eastern Games (1923, 1927, 1930, and 1934). He also stood out in the Philippine vs. Formosa Dual Meets (1929, 1931, 1933, and 1937).

He collected a total of 144 medals in his career which lasted until 1937. He won two bronze medals in the 200 m breaststroke event, at the 1928 and 1932 Summer Olympics, and placed 7th in the 1936 edition.

World War II and death
During World War II, Yldefonso fought against the Japanese in Bataan as part of the Philippine Scouts, reaching the rank of lieutenant.

He survived the Bataan Death March, but later died in Japanese captivity at Camp O'Donnell, Capas, Tarlac. His remains have never been recovered as he was interred in a mass grave, along with other dead soldiers. His name is etched in the Walls of the Missing at the Manila American Cemetery.

Personal life
Yldefonso was married to Manuela Ella in 1925 with whom he had six children: Porfirio, Emilio, Felipe, Norma, Herminia, and Carmelito.

Legacy
Yldefonso was named as part of the Hall of Fame by the International Swimming Federation in 2009. His unorthodox style of swimming would later become known as the "Yldefonso Stroke". It has been adapted by smaller swimmers, especially those from Asia, particularly the Japanese. 

Yldefenso was often referred to as "The Father of the Modern Breaststroke" in European textbooks. He is crediting for popularizing a style which brought breaststroke closer to the surface of the water rather than underwater which was the common during his time.

President Ferdinand Marcos also awarded Yldefonso the Presidential Award for Meritorious Service.

In 2006, the municipal government of Piddig unveiled a monument in Yldefonso's honor for his feats in swimming and World War II.

His daughter, Norma, competed at the 2nd Asian Games held in Manila, Philippines and won a silver medal in the 100m butterfly event.

References

External links
 

1903 births
1942 deaths
Male breaststroke swimmers
Filipino male swimmers
Filipino military personnel of World War II
Bataan Death March prisoners
Olympic swimmers of the Philippines
Swimmers at the 1928 Summer Olympics
Swimmers at the 1932 Summer Olympics
Swimmers at the 1936 Summer Olympics
Olympic bronze medalists for the Philippines
Medalists at the 1928 Summer Olympics
Medalists at the 1932 Summer Olympics
Sportspeople from Ilocos Norte
Ilocano people
Olympic bronze medalists in swimming
Filipino prisoners of war
Philippine Sports Hall of Fame inductees
United States Army personnel killed in World War II